The Woman from China is a 1931 British crime film directed by Edward Dryhurst and starring Julie Suedo, Gibb McLaughlin and Frances Cuyler. It was shot at Isleworth Studios as a quota quickie.

Cast
Julie Suedo as Laloe Berchmans
Gibb McLaughlin as Chung-Li
Frances Cuyler as Celia Thorburn
Tony Wylde as Lieutenant Jack Halliday
Kiyoshi Takase as Chinaman
R. Byron Webber as Berchmans
George Wynn as Officer
Clifford Pembroke as Snell
Laurie Leslie as Garcia
Ian Wilson as Cabin boy

References

Bibliography
 Chibnall, Steve. Quota Quickies: The Birth of the British 'B' Film. British Film Institute, 2007.
 Low, Rachael. Filmmaking in 1930s Britain. George Allen & Unwin, 1985.
 Wood, Linda. British Films, 1927-1939. British Film Institute, 1986.

External links

1930 films
British crime films
1930s crime films
Films directed by Edward Dryhurst
Seafaring films
Films set in Shanghai
Films set in London
Films shot at Isleworth Studios
Quota quickies
British black-and-white films
1930s English-language films
1930s British films